Vice Admiral Rob A. Kramer was the Commander of the Royal Netherlands Navy from 22 September 2017. Rear Admiral René Tas replace him after his retirement on 9 September 2021.

Personal life 
Kramer is married to Colette E. Kramer with two children.

Military decorations 
  Commemorative Medal for Peace Operations
  Officers' Cross
  Navy medal
  Cross for demonstrated marching skills
  National sport medal
  NATO Medal
  Officer in the Legion of Honour

References 

Living people
Commanders of the Royal Netherlands Navy
Royal Netherlands Navy personnel
Military personnel from The Hague
Year of birth missing (living people)
Place of birth missing (living people)
21st-century Dutch military personnel